Gregory Dion Jelks (16 August 1961 – 6 January 2017) was an American Australian baseball player who played with the Philadelphia Phillies. He spent the majority of his career in the minor leagues, and was most notable playing with the Australia national baseball team and the Perth Heat in the Australian Baseball League.

Professional career
Born in Centre, Alabama, Jelks attended Cherokee County High School (Alabama), where he earned all-state honours in baseball and basketball. He attended Gadsden State Community College, where he played both sports for the Cardinals. The following summer Jelks made his debut with the Bend Phillies of the Northwest League. The following year, Jelks hit 24 home runs and 75 RBI for the Spartanburg Spinners in A class ball of the South Atlantic League. In , Jelks appeared in 123 AAA games for the Maine Guides and that summer, Jelks was promoted to Philadelphia for 10 games, where out of eleven at bats he collected one hit, a double off Montreal Expos pitcher Neal Heaton. Over the course of eight minor league seasons, Jelks totaled 771 games, 96 home runs, 361 RBI, and a career batting average of .245.

During the 1990s, he played professionally in Italy and Australia. In , he started his ABL career with the Perth Heat and Jelks enjoyed Australia, and decided to live in Perth, where he earned dual citizenship. Apart from a short stint with the Melbourne Reds in 1996, Jelks continued to play for the Heat throughout the ABL, as well as with Western Australia for the International Baseball League of Australia.

In the 1997 Intercontinental Cup, Jelks batted .471/.538/1.088 to help Australia win a bronze medal for the first time ever in a global event. He was second in average in the event behind Paul Gonzalez and tied Orestes Kindelán for the home run lead. Jelks was named on the All-Star team of the cup at designated hitter. The following year at the 1998 Baseball World Cup, he hit .278 as the starting left fielder for Australia and helped Australia to silver at the  Haarlem Baseball Week. Jelks went on to play in the 1999 Intercontinental Cup and 2000 Sydney Olympics.

Managerial career
Jelks began his professional managerial career in  when he helped coach Australia at the 2000 Sydney Olympics and started head coaching in 2002 when he took the helm of the Evansville Otters of the independent Frontier League. In 2006, he was appointed to a coaching role for the national team at the 2006 World Baseball Classic.

Later that year, Greg led the Otters to a championship . The following season, he was hired by the Frontier League as the manager of the fledgling expansion team the Slippery Rock Sliders. The Sliders were a concept team, building off a unique relationship with Slippery Rock University. Following a year of poor fan reception and a last place finish in the league, the Slippery Rock Sliders folded and the franchise became the Midwest Sliders, a travelling team in the league's Eastern Division. Greg Jelks was hired by the Washington Wild Things the following December, and began the 2008 season managing his third Frontier League franchise. Jelks was let go by the Wild Things after he did not lead them to the playoffs, and to a 48–48 record.

Death 
On a flight en route to Australia from the United States, Jelks fell asleep and could not be woken up, later being pronounced dead on January 6, 2017, aged 55. Jelks became the first MLB player in history to have died in Australia.

References

External links

Slippery Rock Sliders Coach, Greg Jelks – YouTube
Jelks obit

1961 births
2017 deaths
African-American baseball players
American emigrants to Australia
Baseball players from Alabama
Baseball players at the 2000 Summer Olympics
People from Cherokee County, Alabama
Olympic baseball players of Australia
Major League Baseball infielders
Philadelphia Phillies players
Duluth-Superior Dukes players
Catskill Cougars players
Perth Heat players
Gadsden State Cardinals baseball players
Gadsden State Cardinals men's basketball players
American expatriate baseball players in Australia
20th-century African-American sportspeople
21st-century African-American people
Bend Phillies players
Louisville Redbirds players
Maine Guides players
Maine Phillies players
Piratas de Campeche players
American expatriate baseball players in Mexico
Portland Beavers players
Reading Phillies players
Spartanburg Spinners players
African-American baseball coaches
Naturalised citizens of Australia
Naturalised sports competitors